Cuproxena aequitana is a species of moth of the family Tortricidae. It is found in Napo Province, Ecuador.

The wingspan is 19.5 mm. The ground colour of the forewings is yellowish cream, forming an elongate-triangular area along the costa, but the costal edge is rust coloured. The base of the wing and the dorsum are suffused with ferruginous and the subterminal portion of the wing is paler, followed by a ferruginous cream terminal area. The hindwings are cream with a cream ferruginous apical area.

Etymology
The species name refers to the uniform colouration and is derived from Latin aequitas (meaning uniformity, evenness).

References

Moths described in 2007
Cuproxena
Moths of South America
Taxa named by Józef Razowski